Shararat (meaning "Mischief") is a 1959 Hindi romantic drama film written, produced and directed by H. S. Rawail. It stars Raaj Kumar, Kishore Kumar, Meena Kumari, Kumkum in lead roles, with the memorable  song "Hum Matwale Naujawan"
sung by Kishore Kumar. Here, Meena Kumari matched the boisterous Kishore Kumar. This film is also unique because it featured Kishore Kumar singing his own songs, two versions of a classical raga based song ("Ajab Hai Daastaan Teri Yeh Zindagi") that were picturised on Kishore Kumar were sung by Mohammad Rafi,  on Kishore Kumar's insistence.

Plot 
Chandan and Shabnam are in love and engaged to be married, but Shabnam's father decides to marry her to Suraj. Chandan commits suicide. After her marriage, Shabnam is shocked to find out that Suraj's younger brother Deepak is the spitting the image of Chandan. Soon she finds herself being accused of illicit liaisons with Deepak. Deepak leaves home, but a mischief maker engineers a meeting between the two in order to convince Suraj that his wife is being unfaithful to him.

Cast
 Raaj Kumar as Suraj
 Kishore Kumar as Chandan / Deepak (Double Role) 
 Meena Kumari as Shabnam
 Kumkum as Jyoti

Soundtrack

References

External links 
 

1953 films
1950s Hindi-language films
Indian black-and-white films
Indian romantic drama films
1953 romantic drama films